Ranvir Vinay Aur Kaun? (Transl. 'Ranvir, Vinay and who else?') is a Hindi talk show that aired on STAR One. Hosted by Vinay Pathak and Ranvir Shorey, the show regularly featured celebrity guests and comedy gags. The show, which was launched on 6 August 2007, ran for 52 episodes and ended on 1 November 2007.

Guests
 Abhijeet Bhattacharya
 Urvashi Dholakia
 Shakti Kapoor
 David Dhawan
 Sarita Joshi
 Deven Bhojani
 Javed Akhtar
 Tanushree Dutta
 Tusshar Kapoor
 Sandhya Mridul
 Gulshan Grover
 Archana Puran Singh
 Kiron Kher
 Meghna Naidu
 Kim Sharma
 Karan Johar
 Konkona Sen Sharma
 Asrani

External links
Official Site - India
Official Site - UK

Star One (Indian TV channel) original programming
Indian television talk shows
2007 Indian television series endings